Michael Rex Horne OBE  FREng, FRS (29 December 1921 – 6 January 2000) was an English structural engineer, scientist and academic who pioneered the theory of the Plastic Design of Structures.

Early life and education 
Horne was born in Leicester, England on 29 December 1921. He was educated at Boston Grammar School, Leeds Grammar School and St John's College, Cambridge, where he graduated in Mechanical Sciences with first class honours in 1941

Career 
After graduation Horne worked as an assistant engineer for the River Great Ouse Catchment Board before moving back to Cambridge to work with John Baker, Baron Baker, :de:Jacques Heyman and Bernard Neal. 
In 1960 Horne moved to the chair of Civil Engineering at the University of Manchester. Horne served on the Merrison Committee of Enquiry into the Collapse of Box Girder Bridges
Horne was President of the Institution of Structural Engineers in 1980-81

Awards and honours 
Honorary DSc University of Salford 1981
The Institution of Civil Engineers Telford Premiums in 1956, 1966 and 1978 and their Baker Medal in 1977. 
The Institution of Structural Engineers Henry Adams award in 1970-71 and their Oscar Faber Bronze medal in 1972-3. 
The Gold Medal of the Institution of Structural Engineers in 1986 and their Kerensky Medal 1988

Books 
Baker J F, Horne M R, Heyman J (1956) The Steel Skeleton I, II, Cambridge University Press, UK
Horne M R (2014) Plastic Theory of Structures: In SI/Metric Units (2nd Edition), Elsevier Science,

References 

 

Presidents of the Institution of Structural Engineers
Structural engineers
Fellows of the Royal Society
Fellows of the Royal Academy of Engineering
Officers of the Order of the British Empire
IStructE Gold Medal winners
Engineering educators
People educated at Boston Grammar School
1921 births
2000 deaths
Alumni of St John's College, Cambridge